Nellie Davis Ross (née Tayloe; November 29, 1876 – December 19, 1977) was an American educator and politician who served as the 14th governor of Wyoming from 1925 to 1927, and as the 28th and first female director of the United States Mint from 1933 to 1953. She was the first woman to serve as governor of a U.S. state, and remains the only woman to have served as governor of Wyoming.

Ross was born in St. Joseph, Missouri, to James Wynns Tayloe, a native of Tennessee, and Elizabeth Blair Green, who owned a plantation on the Missouri River. Her family moved to Miltonvale, Kansas in 1884, and she graduated from Miltonvale High School in 1892. She attended a teacher-training college for two years and taught kindergarten for four years.

On September 11, 1902, Ross married William B. Ross, whom she had met when visiting relatives in Tennessee in 1900. William B. Ross was governor of Wyoming from 1923 to his death on October 2, 1924. Ross succeeded her late husband's successor Frank Lucas as governor when she won the special election, becoming the first female American governor on January 5, 1925. She was a staunch supporter of Prohibition during the 1920s. She lost re-election in 1926, but remained an active member of the Democratic Party.

In 1933, Ross became the first female Director of the United States Mint. Despite initial mistrust, she forged a strong bond with Mary Margaret O'Reilly, the Assistant Director of the Mint and one of the United States' highest-ranking female civil servants of her time. Ross served five terms as Director, retiring in 1953. During her later years, she wrote for various women's magazines and traveled. Ross died in Washington, D. C., at the age of 101.

Early life and education 
Born Nellie Davis Taylor in St. Joseph, Missouri, Ross was the sixth child, and first daughter, of James Wynns Tayloe, a native of Stewart County, Tennessee, and his wife, Elizabeth Blair Green, who owned a plantation on the Missouri River. She spent much of her childhood in the Florence and Decatur in northern Alabama's Tennessee Valley. In 1884, when Ross was seven years of age, her family moved to Miltonvale in Cloud County in northern Kansas. This relocation happened after her father's old family home back in St. Joseph burned, and the sheriff was about to foreclose on the property.

After Ross graduated from Miltonville High School in 1892, her family moved to Omaha, Nebraska. During this time, she taught private piano lessons and attended a two year training program for kindergarten teachers that was sponsored by the Omaha city school system. She then taught kindergarten for four years. Two of her brothers sent her on a trip to Europe in 1896.

While on a visit to her relatives in Dover, Tennessee, in 1900, Ross met William Bradford Ross, whom she married on September 11, 1902. They had three children (twins James Ambrose and George Taylor, and Alfred Duff). William Ross practiced law and planned to live in the American West. He moved to Cheyenne and established a law practice, bringing his wife to join him. Ross became a leader in Wyoming's Democratic Party served as Laramie County's prosecuting attorney from 1906 to 1907. In 1910 he was an unsuccessful candidate for Wyoming's at-large congressional seat, and in 1918 he was an unsuccessful candidate for the Democratic nomination for governor.

Governorship of Wyoming 
In 1922, William Ross was elected governor of Wyoming by appealing to progressive voters in both parties. However, after little more than a year and a half in office, he died on October 2, 1924 from surgical complications following an appendectomy. The Democratic Party then nominated his widow, Nellie, to run for governor in a special election the following month.

Nellie Ross refused to campaign but easily won the race on November 4, 1924. On January 5, 1925, she became the first female governor in the history of the United States. As governor she continued her late husband's policies, which called for tax cuts, government assistance for poor farmers, banking reform, and laws protecting children, women workers, and miners. She urged Wyoming to ratify a pending federal amendment prohibiting child labor. Like her husband, she advocated the strengthening of prohibition laws.

Ross ran for re-election in 1926, and relied on campaign surrogates including Cecilia Hennel Hendricks, the Democratic nominee for State Superintendent of Public Instruction, but was narrowly defeated. She attributed her loss in part to her refusal to campaign for herself and support for prohibition. She remained active in the Democratic Party and campaigned for Al Smith in the 1928 presidential election, even though the two disagreed on prohibition. At the 1928 Democratic National Convention, she received 31 votes from ten states for vice president on the first ballot. She also gave a speech seconding Smith's nomination. After the convention, she served as vice chairman of the Democratic National Committee and as director of the DNC Women's Division.

Director of U.S. Mint

Appointment by FDR 
U.S. President Franklin D. Roosevelt appointed Ross as director of the U.S. Mint on May 3, 1933, making her the first woman to hold that position. Ross and the Mint's Assistant Director Mary Margaret O'Reilly, "the Sweetheart of the Treasury" who had worked at the Mint since 1904, had mutual suspicions to overcome. Ross, who had endured poor relations with Eleanor Roosevelt and others on FDR's campaign, did not trust the career staff. O'Reilly saw another political appointee with no experience at the Mint Bureau replacing Robert J. Grant, who had been Denver Mint superintendent before his directorship. After a brief period, the two women came to appreciate each other's merits.

Tenure 
Ross and O'Reilly soon came to the usual division of labor between director and assistant: the director would handle public affairs and make policy decisions as needed, while the assistant dealt with the day-to-day business of the bureau. Ross undertook a heavy travel schedule, visiting Mint facilities, making speeches backing Roosevelt, and campaigning for Democratic candidates in Wyoming. This left O'Reilly running the Washington office as acting director. The two women carried on a businesslike but warm correspondence during these times, with O'Reilly writing to Ross (who had embarked on a tour of the mints) "I am so anxious to have your mind at ease about the office here [in Washington] that I have resorted to rather frequent telegrams.  They are so much more direct and up to date than letters ... my love to you and every good wish for the success of your visits to our beloved mint institutions." Teva J. Scheer, biographer of Ross, suggests that O'Reilly would have found Ross's reports from the field valuable; they showed how the Mint recovered from the initial years of the Depression, when relatively few coins were produced, to the mid-1930s, when strong demand for coinage led the bureau to run the mints with two or even three shifts.

O'Reilly's retirement 
In 1935, O'Reilly reached the mandatory federal retirement age of 70. Ross requested that President Roosevelt exempt O'Reilly from mandatory retirement because her knowledge of bureau affairs was so extensive and was badly needed. A special order of President Roosevelt gave O'Reilly an extra year in the Mint Service. During the extension, Ross hired Frank Leland Howard of the University of Virginia, who had a background in accounting, as O'Reilly's prospective replacement. Howard replaced O'Reilly when she retired on October 29, 1938, after two more extensions.

Legacy 
Ross' tenure saw the Mint in 1944 investigate how several 1933 double eagles, never officially released, had come onto the market. She is known for establishing the Franklin half dollar and starting the making of proof coins for public sale. Ross served five full terms until her retirement in 1953 and was succeeded by William H. Brett, whom President Dwight D. Eisenhower nominated in 1954.

Later years and death 
After her retirement, Ross contributed articles to various women's magazines and traveled extensively. She made her last trip to Wyoming in 1972 at the age of ninety-six. Five years later, she died in Washington, D.C., at the age of 101; at the time of her death, she was the oldest ex-governor in the United States. She is interred in the family plot in Lakeview Cemetery in Cheyenne.

See also
List of female governors in the United States

References

Sources

External links 

Nellie Tayloe Ross Papers at the University of Wyoming – American Heritage Center

Historic film footage of Nellie Tayloe Ross, Director of US Mint, and staff overseeing first gold shipment from Philadelphia US Mint to Fort Knox, January 1937.

|-

|-

1876 births
1977 deaths
American centenarians
American Episcopalians
Democratic Party governors of Wyoming
Directors of the United States Mint
Female candidates for Vice President of the United States
First Ladies and Gentlemen of Wyoming
People from Cloud County, Kansas
Politicians from St. Joseph, Missouri
Women in Wyoming politics
Women state governors of the United States
20th-century American women politicians
20th-century American politicians
Women centenarians
Franklin D. Roosevelt administration personnel
Truman administration personnel
Eisenhower administration personnel
Temperance activists